R. Muthamilselvam is an Indian politician in the All India Anna Dravida Munnetra Kazhagam party. He was elected as a member of the Tamil Nadu Legislative Assembly from Vikravandi on 24 October 2019.

References

Living people
Year of birth missing (living people)
Members of the Tamil Nadu Legislative Assembly
All India Anna Dravida Munnetra Kazhagam politicians
Dravida Munnetra Kazhagam politicians